Andreas Bronislaw Wadeksloff Nielsen (31 March 1918 – 27 February 1945) was a member of the Danish resistance executed by the German occupying power.

Biography 

Andreas Bronislaw Wadeksloff Nielsen was born 31 March 1918 in Ragnersminde, Brøndbyvester outside of marriage. His mother was Maria Olszowa born 29 April 1889 in Poland. He was baptized Bronislaw in the Roman Catholic Sankt Laurentius church in nearby Roskilde on the seventh Sunday of Trinity 1918.

On 7 January 1927 he was adopted and given the name Andreas Bronislaw Wadeksloff Nielsen. His foster parents were livestock farmer Karlo Kristen Nielsen and wife Kristine née Pedersen.

He was confirmed in the church of Denmark in Rødovre, on the second Sunday of Easter in 1932.

On 19 February 1939 he married Ingrid Kathrine Jensen.

As a member of the resistance he was a mechanic and a driver.

On 26 February 1945 a German court martial sentenced Nielsen to death and the following day he and nine other resistance members were executed in Ryvangen.

After his death 

After the liberation he was exhumed in Ryvangen and a death certificate was issued by the Department of Forensic Medicine of the university of Copenhagen, stating that the cause of death was ballistic trauma.

A memorial service was held for him in Rødovre church on 1 July 1945.

On 29 August 1945 Nielsen and 105 other victims of the occupation were given a state funeral in the memorial park founded at the execution and burial site in Ryvangen where he was executed. Bishop Hans Fuglsang-Damgaard led the service with participation from the royal family, the government and representatives of the resistance movement.

The cemetery in Rødovre has a memorial plaque for him.

References 

1918 births
1945 deaths
People executed by Nazi Germany by firing squad
Danish resistance members
Danish people executed by Nazi Germany
Resistance members killed by Nazi Germany